Bundu Khan (1880 – 1955) was an Indian sarangi player.

Early life and career
Bundu Khan was born in Delhi in a family of musicians. He received his early training in sarangi from his father Ali Jan Khan starting at 8 years of age, and later from his uncle Mamman Khan, a veteran Sarangi and Sursagar Player who belonged to the Patiala gharana (House of Patiala) of classical musicians. Bundu Khan played the sarangi from All India Radio, Delhi Station, when it first started broadcasting in 1935. He served the princely court of Indore for 27 years as a court-musician. He studied Sanskrit in order to have access to the classical music of ancient India. He introduced what is known as Meendh Soot Ki Sargam in which the musician, in the midst of recurring melody, shifts from one note to another. He had mastered more than 500 Ragas. "He had great mastery over Raga system, Taan-palta, various traditional compositions – especially Ragas such as Malkauns, Malhar, Bhairav."

"Bundu Khan's sarangi was smaller in size than the usual one, with some metal strings instead of gut strings and so it sounded much different."

Bundu Khan was also a musical theorist or a musicologist. His book on music, Jauhar-i-Mausiqi in Urdu, known as Sangeet Vivek Darpan in Hindi, was published simultaneously in Urdu and Hindi in June 1934.

Death and legacy
He migrated to Pakistan and lived in Karachi until his death on 13 January 1955. "After migrating to Pakistan after the independence of Pakistan in 1947, Khan continued to play the sarangi from all the radio stations of Pakistan until his death in 1955. His sons Umrao Bundu Khan and Bulund Iqbal Khan have continued his musical tradition.

Awards and recognition
Pride of Performance Award by the President of Pakistan in 1985.

References

External links 
Description of Sarangi (musical instrument) on Encyclopedia Britannica
Ustad Bundu Khan recordings available on www.sarangi.info

1880 births
1955 deaths
Hindustani instrumentalists
People from Delhi
People from Karachi
Muhajir people
Recipients of the Pride of Performance
Sarangi players
Pakistani musicians